The 2009 TT Pro League season (known as the Digicel Pro League for sponsorship reasons) was the eleventh season of the TT Pro League, the Trinidad and Tobago professional league for association football clubs, since its establishment in 1999. A total of eleven teams contested the league, with San Juan Jabloteh the defending champions. The season began on 8 May, with Super Friday, and ended on 27 October. The format of the season was changed from each club playing three rounds to two rounds in the regular season to facilitate the national team with its attempt to qualify for the 2010 FIFA World Cup.

Police were re-admitted into the league following a one-year absence, whereas FC South End were admitted as a new club. However, North East Stars withdrew siting the state of their home ground, Sangre Grande Recreational Ground, for the past few years as the cause to sit out the season. The Sangre Grande Boys stated that they intend to return to the league for 2010. Furthermore, Caledonia AIA changed the name of the club to Caledonia AIA of Morvant/Laventille.

The first goal of the season was scored by Caledonia AIA's Walter Moore against Joe Public in the second minute of the first game on 8 May. Kendall Velox of Caledonia AIA scored the first hat-trick of the season against Police on 23 May. Kerry Baptiste won the Golden Boot by providing 35 goals for Joe Public on their way to becoming league champions.

On 12 September, Joe Public used a 2–1 win over W Connection at Manny Ramjohn Stadium to clinch the regular season crown on 41 points. San Juan Jabloteh, Caledonia AIA, W Connection, Ma Pau, and Defence Force all qualified for the Big Six. On 24 October, Joe Public claimed the league title with a 1–1 draw against Caledonia AIA. The achievement marked their second Pro League title with the first coming in the 2006 season. Having finished as the league champion, Joe Public qualified for the 2010 CFU Club Championship. By finishing runners-up in the league, San Juan Jabloteh also qualified for the CFU Club Championship.

With an 8–0 loss to W Connection on 1 September, Police finished bottom in the league. The club had a disappointing campaign having only recorded nine points with a -48 goal difference. This marked the first season in which Tobago United did not finish the league season bottom of the table. Furthermore, on 8 January 2010, United Petrotrin announced that they had pulled the club from the Pro League.

Changes from the 2008 season
The following changes were made since the 2008 season:

The TT Pro League signed a sponsorship deal with Digicel and is now known as the Digicel Pro League.
The number of rounds in the regular season were reduced from three to two to compensate the national team's attempt to qualify for the 2010 FIFA World Cup.
Club rosters were expanded from 25 to 35 players to provide clubs relief during the league season that involved 2010 FIFA World Cup qualification, CONCACAF Champions League, and other domestic fixtures.
There were a number of changes to the clubs competing in the 2009 season.
FC South End, a new club based in Point Fortin were admitted into the league.
North East Stars withdrew from the league and will return in 2010.
Police were re-admitted after sitting out the 2008 season.
Caledonia AIA changed the name of the club to Caledonia AIA of Morvant/Laventille.
The Trinidad and Tobago U20 national team were admitted to the Pro League to prepare for the 2009 FIFA U-20 World Cup in Egypt, but eventually did not enter.
Applications for admission by Marabella Flames, 1976 Phoenix, and St. Clair's Coaching School to join the Pro League were rejected.
The Pro Bowl was shifted to close off the 2009 calendar in November and December with new branding partner Digicel following a pullout by former sponsors Courts Trinidad and Tobago Limited.
A new knockout tournament named the Lucozade Sport Goal Shield took place in May and June with a unique prize money system. As a result, Lucozade Sport will no longer sponsor the Big Six.

Teams

Team summaries

Note: Flags indicate national team as has been defined under FIFA eligibility rules. Players may hold more than one non-FIFA nationality.

Player transfers

Managerial changes

Regular season

Competition table

Results

Pro League Big Six

Competition table

Results

League table

Positions by round

Season statistics

Scoring
 First goal of the season: Walter Moore for Caledonia AIA against Joe Public, (8 May 2009).
 Last goal of the season: Akim Armstrong for Caledonia AIA against Defence Force, (27 October 2009).
 First own goal of the season: Randy Harris (Police) for United Petrotrin, (19 May 2009).
 First penalty kick of the season: Reginald Payne (scored) for Tobago United against Ma Pau (9 May 2009).
 First hat-trick of the season: Kendall Velox (Caledonia AIA) against Police, 22', 40', 62' (23 May 2009).
 Most goals scored by one player in a match: 5 goals
 Kerry Baptiste (Joe Public) against St. Ann's Rangers, 13', 41', 45', 78', 88' (21 July 2009).
 Widest winning margin: 8 goals
 W Connection 8–0 Police (4 September 2009)
 Most goals in a match: 9 goals
 Caledonia AIA 7–2 Police (18 August 2009)
 San Juan Jabloteh 5–4 Defence Force (15 October 2009)
 Most goals in one half: 7 goals
 San Juan Jabloteh v Defence Force (15 October 2009) 1–1 at half-time, 5–4 final.
 Most goals in one half by a single team: 5 goals
 W Connection v Police (4 September 2009) 5–0 at half-time, 8–0 final.

Top scorers

Hat-tricks

 * Home team score first in result
 4 Player scored four goals
 5 Player scored five goals

Discipline
 First yellow card of the season: Nuru Abdallah Muhammad for Caledonia AIA against Joe Public, (8 May 2009).
 First red card of the season: Mark Leslie for Ma Pau against Tobago United, (9 May 2009).
 Most yellow cards in a single match: 6
 W Connection 0–1 United Petrotrin – 2 for W Connection (Eder Gilmar Aras & Gerard Williams) and 4 for United Petrotrin (Cyd Gray, Lyndon Diaz, Ghymo Harper & Nigel Daniel) (23 June 2009)
 Joe Public 1–1 United Petrotrin – 3 for Joe Public (Kerry Baptiste, Keyeno Thomas & Jason Springer) and 3 for United Petrotrin (Cyd Gray, Makan Hislop & Luis Andre Lima) (25 July 2009)
 Most red cards in a single match: 2
 W Connection 0–1 United Petrotrin – 2 for W Connection (Eder Gilmar Arias & Marvin Phillip) (23 June 2009)
 San Juan Jabloteh 3–0 Police – 1 for San Juan Jabloteh (Noel Williams) and 1 for Police (Devon Bristol) (3 July 2009)

Awards

Round awards

Annual awards
The 2009 TT Pro League awards distribution took place on 7 April 2010, at Cascadia Hotel in St. Ann's, Trinidad, prior to the 2010–11 season.

Joe Public took home the majority of the league honours including Team of the Year. Eastern Lion Kerry Baptiste was named the league's Player of the Year for the first time in his career, by providing 35 league goals. Baptiste also received the Golden Boot and was named the Best Forward. Joe Public manager Derek King became the youngest manager in the Pro League to win the league championship and claimed the Manager of the Year. In addition, Joe Public's Alejandro Figueroa, Trent Noel, and Keyeno Thomas were named the league's Best Goalkeeper, Best Midfielder, and Best Defender respectively. The remaining team award was won by Caledonia AIA for the Most Disciplined Team of the Year. FIFA international referee, Neal Brizan, won the Referee of the Year for the third consecutive year, whereas Boris Punch won the Match Commissioner of the Year in back-to-back years.

References

External links
Official Website
Soca Warriors Online, TT Pro League

TT Pro League seasons
1
Trinidad
Trinidad